Karlslunds IF is a Swedish sports club with several departments, located in Örebro.

Karlslunds IF runs one of the biggest programme for athletics in Örebro, Sweden, with some 4000 members and more than 200 coaches coaching eight different sports. Currently women's football (known as KIF Örebro DFF) and skiing have the most successful teams.

History
The club was founded on April 27, 1920 by a group of young athletes living in the Karlslund area in western Örebro. With an original focus on athletics, skiing and football, the club quickly branched into other sports, becoming one of Örebro's most successful sports clubs of the 20th and 21st century.

Sports 

 Bandy: Karlslunds IF Bandy
 Baseball and softball:  KIF Eagles Baseball & Softball
 Bowling: Karlslunds IF Bowling
 Men's football: Karlslunds IF FK
 Women's football: KIF Örebro DFF
 Gymnastics: Örebro Gymnastikförening - KIF
 Skiing: Karlslunds IF Skiing
 Swimming: Örebro Simallians
 American football: Karlsunds IF American football

External links 
Karlslunds IF - Official Website
Karlslunds IF Örebro - Women's Football
Karlslunds IF Örebro - Skiing

1920 establishments in Sweden
Sports teams in Sweden
Multi-sport clubs in Sweden
Sport in Örebro
Bandy clubs established in 1920